Florianów may refer to the following places:
Florianów, Kutno County in Łódź Voivodeship (central Poland)
Florianów, Zgierz County in Łódź Voivodeship (central Poland)
Florianów, Masovian Voivodeship (east-central Poland)
Florianów, Silesian Voivodeship (south Poland)